Ruel Ishaku (born 11 January 1967) is a Nigerian Paralympic gold medal-winning powerlifter.

Biography
Ishaku was born in 1967 in Nigeria. He suffers from poliomyelitis which means he has to walk with the use of crutches.

Career
Ishaku made his debut at the 2000 Summer Paralympics. He competed in the Men's up to 48 kg but did not record a valid lift.

He competed at the 2004 Summer Paralympics and won bronze in the same event. At the 2008 Summer Paralympics he won the gold medal.

Ishaku competed in and won gold at the 2006 Commonwealth Games in powerlifting. It was the only weightlifting event that Nigeria was allowed to enter as the nation was banned from able-bodied lifting when three of its lifters infringed anti-doping rules.

References

Powerlifters at the 2000 Summer Paralympics
Powerlifters at the 2004 Summer Paralympics
Powerlifters at the 2008 Summer Paralympics
Paralympic gold medalists for Nigeria
Paralympic silver medalists for Nigeria
Living people
1967 births
Nigerian male weightlifters
Commonwealth Games medallists in weightlifting
Commonwealth Games gold medallists for Nigeria
Powerlifters at the 2006 Commonwealth Games
Medalists at the 2004 Summer Paralympics
Medalists at the 2008 Summer Paralympics
Paralympic medalists in powerlifting
Paralympic powerlifters of Nigeria
Nigerian powerlifters
21st-century Nigerian people
Medallists at the 2006 Commonwealth Games